Rosnay is a commune in the Marne department in north-eastern France.  The composer Théodore Dubois was a native of Rosnay.

See also
Communes of the Marne department

References

Communes of Marne (department)